Richard Semler Barthelmess (May 9, 1895 – August 17, 1963) was an American film actor, principally of the Hollywood silent era. He starred opposite Lillian Gish in D. W. Griffith's Broken Blossoms (1919) and Way Down East (1920) and was among the founders of the Academy of Motion Picture Arts and Sciences in 1927. The following year, he was nominated for the Academy Award for Best Actor for two films: The Patent Leather Kid and The Noose.

Early life
Barthelmess was born in New York City, the son of Caroline W. Harris, a stage actress, and Alfred W. Barthelmess. His father died when he was a year old. Through his mother, he grew up in the theatre, doing "walk-ons" from an early age. In contrast to that, he was educated at Hudson River Military Academy at Nyack, New York and Trinity College at Hartford, Connecticut. He did some acting in college and other amateur productions. By 1919 he had five years in stock company experience.

Career
Russian actress Alla Nazimova, a friend of the family, was taught English by Caroline Barthelmess. Nazimova convinced Richard Barthelmess to try acting professionally, and he made his debut screen appearance in 1916 in the serial Gloria's Romance as an uncredited extra. He also appeared as a supporting player in several films starring Marguerite Clark. 

His next role, in War Brides opposite Nazimova, attracted the attention of director D.W. Griffith, who offered him several important roles, finally casting him opposite Lillian Gish in Broken Blossoms (1919) and Way Down East (1920). He founded his own production company, Inspiration Film Company, together with Charles Duell and Henry King. One of their films, Tol'able David (1921), in which Barthelmess starred as a teenage mailman who finds courage, was a major success. In 1922, Photoplay described him as the "idol of every girl in America."

Barthelmess had a large female following during the 1920s. An admirer wrote to the editor of Picture-Play Magazine in 1921:Different fans have different opinions, and although Wallace Reid, Thomas Meighan, and Niles Welch are mighty fine chaps, I think that Richard Barthelmess beats them all. Dick is getting more and more popular every day, and why? Because his wonderful black hair and soulful eyes are enough to make any young girl adore him. The first play I saw Dick in was Boots—Dorothy Gish playing the lead. This play impressed me so that I went to see every play in which he appeared—Three Men and a Girl, Scarlet Days, The Love Flower, and Broken Blossoms, in which I decided that Dick was my favorite. I am looking forward to Way Down East as being a great success, because I know Dick will play a good part.

Barthelmess soon became one of Hollywood's higher paid performers, starring in such classics as The Patent Leather Kid in 1927 and The Noose in 1928; he was nominated for Best Actor at the first Academy Awards for his performance in both films. In addition, he won a special citation for producing The Patent Leather Kid. 

With the advent of the sound era, Barthelmess remained a star for a number of years. He played numerous leads in talkie films, most notably Son of the Gods (1930), The Dawn Patrol (1930), The Last Flight (1931), The Cabin in the Cotton (1932) and Heroes for Sale (1933). He was able to choose his own material and often played in controversial or socially conscious films. However, his popularity began to wane in the 1930s as he was getting too old for the boyish leads he usually played, and in his later films between 1939 and his retirement in 1942, he turned towards character roles – most notably in his supporting role as the disgraced pilot and husband of Rita Hayworth's character in Only Angels Have Wings (1939).

Post-acting career
Barthelmess failed to maintain the stardom of his silent film days and gradually left entertainment. He enlisted in the United States Navy Reserve during World War II, and served as a lieutenant commander. He never returned to film, preferring instead to live off his real estate investments.

Personal life
On June 18, 1920, Barthelmess married Mary Hay, a stage and screen star, in New York. They had one daughter, Mary Barthelmess, before divorcing on January 15, 1927.

In August 1927, Barthelmess became engaged to Katherine Young Wilson, a Broadway actress. However, the engagement was called off due to Wilson's stated desire to continue acting, or possibly his affair around this time with the journalist Adela Rogers St. Johns.

On April 21, 1928, Barthelmess married Jessica Stewart Sargent. He later adopted her son, Stewart, from a previous marriage. They remained married until Barthelmess' death in 1963.

Death
Barthelmess died of throat cancer on August 17, 1963, aged 68, in Southampton, New York. He was interred at the Ferncliff Cemetery and Mausoleum in Hartsdale, New York.

Legacy
 Barthelmess was a founder of the Academy of Motion Picture Arts and Sciences.
 In 1960, Barthelmess received a motion picture star on the Hollywood Walk of Fame at 6755 Hollywood Boulevard for his contributions to the film industry.
 Barthelmess was among the second group of recipients of the George Eastman Award in 1957, given by the George Eastman House for distinguished contribution to the art of film.
 Composer Katherine Allan Lively dedicated her piano composition Within the Walls of China: A Chinese Episode to Barthelmess in the sheet music published in 1923 by G. Schirmer, Inc.  An article in The Music Trades reported that Mrs. Lively was inspired by a viewing of the film Broken Blossoms, and performed the piece for Barthelmess and his friends in New York in the summer of 1922.

Filmography

Features

Gloria's Romance (1916) (uncredited)
War Brides (1916) as Arno
Snow White (1916) as Pie Man (uncredited)
Just a Song at Twilight (1916) as George Turner
The Moral Code (1917) as Gary Miller
The Eternal Sin (1917) as Gennaro
The Valentine Girl (1917) as Robert Wentworth
The Soul of a Magdalen (1917) as Louis Broulette
The Streets of Illusion (1917) as Donald Morton
Camille (1917)
Bab's Diary (1917) as Tommy Gray
Bab's Burglar (1917) as Tommy Gray
Nearly Married (1917) as Dick Griffon
 For Valour (1917) as Henry Nobbs
The Seven Swans (1917) as Prince Charming
Sunshine Nan (1918) as MacPherson Clark
Rich Man, Poor Man (1918) as Bayard Varick
Hit-The-Trail Holliday (1918) as Bobby Jason
Wild Primrose (1918) as Jack Wilton
The Hope Chest (1918) as Tom Ballantyne
Boots (1919) as Everett White
The Girl Who Stayed at Home (1919) as Ralph Grey
Three Men and a Girl (1919) as Christopher Kent
Peppy Polly (1919) as Dr. James Merritt
Broken Blossoms (1919) as Cheng Huan - The Yellow Man
I'll Get Him Yet (1919) as Scoop McCready
Scarlet Days (1919) as Don Maria Alvarez
The Idol Dancer (1920) as Dan McGuire
The Love Flower (1920) as Bruce Sanders
Way Down East (1920) as David Bartlett
Experience (1921) as Youth
Tol'able David (1921) as David Kinemon
The Seventh Day (1922) as John Alden Jr.
Sonny (1922) as Sonny Crosby / Joe
The Bond Boy (1922) as Peter Newbolt (father) / John Newbolt
Fury (1923) as Boy Leyton
The Bright Shawl (1923) as Charles Abbott
The Fighting Blade (1923) as Karl Van Kerstenbroock
Twenty-One (1923) as Julian McCullough
The Enchanted Cottage (1924) as Oliver Bashforth
Classmates (1924) as Duncan Irving Jr
New Toys (1925) as Will Webb
Soul-Fire (1925) as Eric Fane
Shore Leave (1925) as D.X. (Bilge) Smith
The Beautiful City (1925) as Tony Gillardi
Just Suppose (1926) as Prince Rupert of Koronia
Ranson's Folly (1926) as Lt. Ranson
The Amateur Gentleman (1926) as Barnabas Barty
The White Black Sheep (1926) as Robert Kincarin
The Patent Leather Kid (1927) as Patent Leather Kid
The Drop Kick (1927) as Jack Hamill
The Noose (1928) as Nickie Elkins
The Little Shepherd of Kingdom Come (1928) as Chad Buford
Wheel of Chance (1928) as Nicolai Turkeltaub / Jacob Taline
Out of the Ruins (1928) as Lt. Pierre Dumont
Scarlet Seas (1928) as Steven Dunkin
Weary River (1929) as Jerry Larrabee
Drag (1929) as David Carroll
Young Nowheres (1929) as Albert 'Binky' Whalen
The Show of Shows (1929) as 'Meet My Sister' Presenter
Son of the Gods (1930) as Sam Lee
The Dawn Patrol (1930) as Dick Courtney
The Lash (1930) as Francisco Delfino 'Pancho'
The Finger Points (1931) as Breckenridge 'Breck' Lee
The Last Flight (1931) as Cary Lockwood
Alias the Doctor (1932) as Karl Brenner
The Cabin in the Cotton (1932) as Marvin Blake
Central Airport (1933) as James 'Jim' Blaine
Heroes for Sale (1933) as Tom Holmes
Massacre (1934) as Chief Joe Thunderhorse
A Modern Hero (1934) as Pierre Radier aka Paul Rader
Midnight Alibi (1934) as Lance McGowan / Robert Anders
Four Hours to Kill! (1935) as Tony Mako
Spy of Napoleon (1936) as Gerard de Lanoy
Only Angels Have Wings (1939) as Bat MacPherson
The Man Who Talked Too Much (1940) as J.B. Roscoe
The Spoilers (1942) as Bronco Kid Farrow
The Mayor of 44th Street (1942) as Ed Kirby (final film role)

Short subjects
Camille (1926) as Gaston (home movie by cariacaturist Ralph Barton)
The Stolen Jools (1931) as Himself
How I Play Golf, by Bobby Jones No. 1: The Putter (1931) as Himself (uncredited)
Starlit Days at the Lido (1935) as Himself (uncredited)
Meet the Stars #5: Hollywood Meets the Navy (1941) as Himself (uncredited)

See also
 List of actors with Academy Award nominations

References
Notes

Bibliography

 Hammond, Michael. War Relic and Forgotten Man: Richard Barthelmess as Celluloid Veteran in Hollywood 1922–1933, Journal of War & Culture Studies, 6:4, 2013, p. 282-301. http://www.maneyonline.com/doi/abs/10.1179/1752628013Y.0000000005

External links

Photographs of Richard Barthelmess

1895 births
1963 deaths
Male actors from New York City
Academy of Motion Picture Arts and Sciences founders
American male film actors
American male silent film actors
Burials at Ferncliff Cemetery
Deaths from throat cancer
Deaths from cancer in New York (state)
People from Long Island
20th-century American male actors
United States Navy officers
Warner Bros. contract players
United States Navy personnel of World War II